Statistics of Football League First Division in the 1962-63 season.

Overview
Everton won the First Division title for the sixth time in the club's history that season. They made sure of the title on May 11, after a 4-1 win over Fulham at Goodison Park. Leyton Orient were relegated on 4 May after a 3-1 defeat at Sheffield Wednesday. Manchester City joined them on the final weekend of the season, losing 6-1 at West Ham United, which saved Birmingham City, who won 3-2 at home against Leicester City.

League standings

Results

Top scorers

References

RSSSF

External links 
wildstat.com

Football League First Division seasons
Eng
1962–63 Football League
1962–63 in English football leagues